Mott's Regiment was made of men from New London and Windham Counties and served first at Fort Ticonderoga in 1775 and eventually at Saratoga in 1777.

Mott’s Regiment
Military units and formations established in 1775
Military in Connecticut